The Nambudiri, also transliterated as Nampoothiri, Nambūdiri, Namboodiri, Namboothiri and Nampūtiri, are a Malayali Brahmin caste, native to what is now the state of Kerala, India, where they constituted part of the traditional feudal elite. As the highest ranking caste in South India, they owned a large portion of the land in the region of Malabar until the Kerala Land Reforms starting in 1957, and intermarried with the Nair monarchs and aristocracy through Sambandham. This marriage relation between the Nambudiris, who were feudal Brahmin lords, and the Nairs, who were kings and warriors, formed a crucial aspect in the administration (Jenmi) of colonial Kerala. The Nambudiris have traditionally lived in ancestral homes known as Illams and have been described by anthropologist Joan Mencher as, "A wealthy, aristocratic landed caste of the highest ritual and secular rank." Venerated as the carriers of the Sanskrit language and ancient Vedic culture, the Nambudiris held more power and authority than the kings and were "above and outside the political systems of the kingdoms."

The spiritual leader of the Nambudiri Brahmins is given the title Azhvanchery Thamprakkal Samrāṭ, with the word "Samrāṭ" meaning "Emperor" in the Sanskrit language. Aside from holding rights over the sacred Guruvayur Temple, the presence and blessings of the Azhvanchery Thamprakkal was a ritual necessity during the coronation of the Zamorin, the Nair king of Kozhikode.

They have historically been distinguished by rare practices such as the adherence to Śrauta ritualism, the Pūrva-Mīmāṁsā school of Hindu philosophy and orthodox traditions, as well as many idiosyncratic customs that are unique among Brahmins, including primogeniture. Cyriac Pullapilly mentions that the dominating influence of the Nambudiris could be found in all matters related to Kerala, including religion, politics, society, economics and culture.

History

Origin
Nambudiri mythology associates their immigration to Kerala from the banks of Narmada, Krishna, Kaveri rivers with the legendary creation of Kerala by Parasurama, the 6th avatar of Vishnu. According to this legend, the region was created when Parasurama threw his axe into the sea Although it is known that the present-day region of Kerala was once governed by the Chera dynasty, little information exists regarding its early ethnography. 
Brahmin presence in the Tamil country is attested from the Sangam period onward. Based on the fact that Nambudiris are Pūrvaśikhā Brahmins wearing the traditional hair tuft on the front, T.P Mahadevan proposes that they are the descendants of these Sangam age Brahmins who moved west into the region of Malabar during the Kalabhra interregnum, with those remaining behind in what is today Tamil Nadu composing the Śōḻiya Brahmins. This sets them apart from the later Aparaśikhā Brahmin (wearing their hair tufts on the back) migrants to South India such as the Tamil Iyers. According to T.P Mahadevan, the Nambudiris brought with them a very early recension of the Mahabharata which became the basis of the Malayalam language version of the epic.

There are lots of theories as to how Nambudiri Brahmins came to settle in Kerala, the commonly accepted point of view is that they moved in from North India via Tulu Nadu or Karnataka. Another theory based on the retention of Mahabharata types as memorized by different Brahmin communities points to Tamil Nadu as the base from which they migrated to Kerala via the Palakkad Gap, which is also the largest opening in the southern Western Ghats, and settled around the river Bharathappuzha. The region around Coimbatore near Karnataka- western Tamil Nadu border was ruled by the Cheras during Sangam period between 1st and the 4th centuries CE and it served as the eastern entrance to the Palakkad Gap, the principal trade route between the Malabar Coast and Tamil Nadu. The Azhvanchery Thamprakkal, who were the titular head of all Nambudiri Brahmins of Kerala, originally had right over parts of present-day Palakkad Taluk. Later they moved westwards along the River Bharathappuzha and settled around the river. Finally the Azhvanchery Thamprakkal bought Athavanad-Tirunavaya region in present-day Tirur Taluk and gave Palakkad to Palakkad Rajas (Tarur Swaroopam) who were originally from Athavanad region. Many of the oldest Nambudiri settlements of Kerala are situated around the River Bharathappuzha. The Kingdom of Tanur, Kingdom of Valluvanad, Perumpadappu Swaroopam, and the kingdom of Palakkad, located around the river Bharathappuzha, were once strongholds of Nambudiris. The introduction of Grantha script which later got evolved into Malayalam script, and the evolution of Malayalam language through Sanskritisation of Karintamil are highly related to the Brahmins who migrated through the Palakkad Gap.

Anthropologists Heike Moser and Paul Younger note that the Nambudiri Brahmin presence predates the 9th century, as attested by grants of land given to them by ruling families. According to the historian Romila Thapar, local kings and chiefs encouraged them to move to the area by offering such tax-exempt land grants in return for them officiating in Vedic rites that would legitimise the grantors' status as rulers. They also gained land and improved their influence over the socio-economic life of the region by helping rulers during the wars between the Chola and Chera dynasties when Vedic schools were turned into military academies. The Azhvanchery Thamprakkal based at Athavanad, who were also the titular head of all Nambudiris and the Lord of Kalpakanchery based at the neighbouring Kalpakanchery were usually present at the coronation (Ariyittu Vazhcha) of a new Zamorin of Calicut. Kalpakanchery Thamprakkal were related  to the Nambudiris of Panniyoor while Azhvanchery Thamprakkal to those of Chowwara, those were among the prominent Nambudiri villages in Kerala.

Early history
Operating from their illam houses, Nambudiris' ownership of agricultural land under the janmi system increased over many centuries and, according to Moser and Younger, they "established landholding temples and taught the people the rules of caste". The Nambudiris have been described to be responsible for the Sanskrit influence on Malayalam, basically a Dravidian language, due to the Nambudiri Brahmin's mixing of Sanskrit and the local Tamil language.

Medieval Kerala has been characterised as an oligarchy which was dominated by the Nambudiris, who owned all the temples and their subsidiary villages. The Nambudiris had influence with the ruling class through the practice of sambandam, where younger Nambudiris used to have relationships with Kshatriya women or women from the upper sections of the Nair caste. The children of such unions were not considered Nambudiris, but a part of their matrilocal lineages. As a result of such unions, many kings and ruling chiefs in Kerala would be the offspring of Nambudiri fathers. These arrangements allowed the Nambudiris to gain political power in addition to religious and cultural dominance.

The Nambudiri's grip on land was maintained through the practice of strict primogeniture and patrilineal inheritance. Despite their younger members having hypergamous relationships with Nairs, whose caste traditions were matrilineal, Nambudiri families remained aloof from general society. Although the historian E. K. Pillai has claimed that the Nambudiris from the 1100s enforced matrilineal polyandry on the previously patrilineal communities of the area, sociologist Randall Collins thinks it is unlikely that such a change could be imposed and says that "more probably it was the result of a process of marriage politics spread by emulation in the decentralised situation of status competition." Some other scholars believe that the matrilineal customs predate the period entirely and cite the queens of the Pandyan dynasty as evidence for this.

Modern history
The unwillingness of Nambudiris to adapt to changes in wider society persisted until the early years of the 20th century but Susan Bayly believes that their decline in significance can be traced to the period 1729-1748 when Marthanda Varma established the Kingdom of Travancore and chose to use Deshastha Brahmins from Tamil Nadu in his civil service. She believes that decision undermined the relationship between the Nambudiri Brahmins and royalty in the region, although others have said that Varma's influence was short-lived and that the main cause of change was the influence of British diplomats who worked with the Travancore Maharaja in the 19th century. After the passing of the Charter Acts of 1833 and 1853 in the British Parliament, the British encouraged the work of Christian missionaries, notably in provision of education, and began the introduction of a judicial system that would have a significant impact on the landholdings, inheritance customs and marriage arrangements of both the Nambudiris and Nairs. The traditional basis of life was challenged by these and other changes, affecting also the other major ethnic groups of the area, such as the Ezhavas and the Syrian Christians. Like others, the desire for social reform went strong among the Nambudiris which led to the formation of the Yogakshema movement in 1908 in order to agitate for the marriage of all the junior males within the community itself. It also focused on popularising the English language study and abolishing the Purdah system among the Nambudiri females.

Religious customs

Vedic learning
The following Vedic recensions are attested among them.

 Rigveda, the Śākala recension which is the only extant recension of the Rigveda across India. The Nambudiris follow both the Āśvalāyana and Śāṅkhāyana Śrauta Sūtras. The latter, called the Kauṣītaki tradition among Nambudiris is restricted to them. The Kauṣītakis are believed to have belonged to the Bāṣkala recension of the Rigveda, but that recension has become extinct among the Nambudiris.
 Yajurveda, the Taittirīya śākhā with the Baudhāyana Śrauta and Gṛhya Sutras, Vādhūla Śrauta and Gṛhya Sutras, and Āgniveśya Gṛhya Sutra
 Samaveda in the Jaiminīya recension, which is elsewhere found only among the Śōḻiya Brahmans, from whom the ancestral Nambudiri population split.

Agnicayana
The ancient Vedic ritual of Agnicayana (the altar of fire), which spans a 12-day period and which Frits Staal and Robert Gardner claim to be one of the oldest known rituals, was maintained by Nambudiri Brahmins until at least 1975. Although it may have largely died out elsewhere in India and thus be symptomatic of the community's resistance to change, David Knipe notes that it is still performed regularly in Andhra Pradesh and has been for centuries.

Domestic culture

Attire
Traditionally, they wore a simple cloth around the waist called a thorthu (or thortumundu), in domestic settings. When they had to travel, they wore two sets of cloth in addition known as a vasthram.

Nambudiris wore their traditional hair tufts (kuṭumi or śikhā) on the front like the Dikshitars of Tamil Nadu.

Marriage customs
Nambudiri Brahmin families practised a more strict version of primogeniture than Brahmin communities elsewhere in India. Under this custom, only the eldest son could marry a Nambudiri woman and thus produce an heir to the family property. Younger sons were restricted to sambandam relationships with non-Brahmin women, whom the Nambudiris considered to be concubines and whose offspring could not inherit. This tradition limited the extent of marriage within their own caste and led to the practice of hypergamy with the Nair community. Kathleen Gough notes that:

The disparity in caste ranking in a relationship between a Brahmin man and a Nair woman meant that the woman was unable to live with her husband(s) in the Brahmin family and so remained in her own family. The children resulting from such marriages always became Nairs. K. M. Panikkar argues that it is this type of relationship that resulted in the matrilineal and matrilocal system. It has also been argued that the practice, along with judicious selection of the man who tied the thali, formed a part of the Nair aspirational culture whereby they would seek to improve their status within the caste. Furthermore, that: 

Although it is certain that in theory hypergamy can cause a shortage of marriageable women in the lowest ranks of a caste and promote upwards social movement from the lower Nair subdivisions, the numbers involved would have been very small. It was not a common practice outside the higher subcaste groups and the Nambudiris had mostly stopped the practice by the 1920s.

Koodiyattam (artform)
The form of Sanskrit theatre known as Koodiyattam, which is native to Kerala, was traditionally patronised by Nambudiris.

See also
Pushpaka Brahmin
Tuluva Brahmin
Smarthavicharam

References

External links

Namboothiri Websites Trust

Brahmin communities of Kerala
Brahmin communities across India
Hindu communities